The Thomas Jefferson Hour is a syndicated public radio program and podcast produced in Bismarck, North Dakota.  It features author-historian Clay S. Jenkinson in a first-person portrayal of Thomas Jefferson, the third US President, and is co-hosted by David Swenson.  Jenkinson remains in-character as Jefferson throughout the first half of the program, delivering monologues and answering listener questions regarding  Jefferson's personal and political life and the history of early America.  The character of Jefferson generally confines his discussion to matters of history, politics, and philosophy as indirect context for modern times, but at times provides a limited analysis of current events (carefully attempting to limit his analysis to matters on which the actual Jefferson's view might be meaningfully determined).  In the second portion of the program, Jenkinson steps out of character to discuss his in-character answers during the first half of the show and also to talk generally about the topic of the episode.

History 
The Jefferson Hour began production in Reno, Nevada in the 1990s. For 12 years, Jenkinson collaborated with co-host  Bill Chrystal (not to be confused with commentator  Bill Kristol), a Congregational pastor and fellow historical interpreter. Chrystal was not the original co-host of the program, however. Jenkinson moved back to North Dakota in 2005, and introduced himself at Swenson's Makoché Recording Studios.

Notes

References

External links
The Thomas Jefferson Hour website

American talk radio programs
American public radio programs
1994 radio programme debuts
Bismarck–Mandan
Cultural depictions of Thomas Jefferson